Little (Chamber) Symphony No. 6, Op. 79, composed by Darius Milhaud in 1923, is a work for oboe, cello, and wordless chorus (soprano, contralto, tenor, bass). It premiered at the Concert Wiener in Paris in 1924.

Background 
Milhaud visited the United States in 1922, and composed this piece in 1923 while in New York City. While there, he heard live jazz and its influence is evident in this piece and his following works, including the 1923 ballet, La création du monde. Little Symphony No. 6 was published in 1929 by Universal, separate from the previous five, which were published by Universal in 1922 and were reprinted by Dover in 2001. It is also the only piece out of the six with no subtitle attached.

Instrumentation and form 
Little Symphony No. 6 runs 7:01 minutes and has a polytonal blues sound. Polytonality is something Milhaud is well known for. This piece has some added dissonance because of the voices even though the instruments chosen are the two closest to the sound of the human voice. The symphony also strays from the typical fast, slow, fast movement setup and does the exact opposite with a slow, fast, slow order of movements. Milhaud goes from a flowing movement, to jaunty, to lyrical in this piece. The wordless voices are something that specifically sticks out in comparison to the previous five symphonies. This is something Milhaud  replicates in his ballet L’homme et son désir, which he composed in 1917 in Brazil. This use of voices within a symphony can also be related to Beethoven’s 9th Symphony's final movement, although Milhaud’s texture is very much unlike a maximized German style of the time period. It is very minimalistic and lessens the significance of the voices with the lack of text.

Movements

Movement 1 
2:53

The first movement has an ABA form and a flowing homophonic vocal line counterpoint to the instruments.  It begins with an oboe solo as the voices come in on a pattern of thirds which comes back later on in the movement.  In the “B” sections the voices are polyphonic and the cello plays the thirds pattern as we heard before and the movement ends with a recap of some of the “A” section.

Movement 2 
1:47

The form of this piece is much less clear in this jaunty, faster movement.  The voices are polyphonic and there are plenty of jazz references throughout.  It is often difficult to decipher the difference between the bass voice and the cello.  The voices are heard in a call and response manner between the males and female voices towards the middle of the movement and it then continues with the vocal polyphony through the end of the movement.

Movement 3 
2:21

The form of this movement is also much less obvious than the first movement. It has a lyrical sound with the oboe playing a recurring jazzy descending ostinato.  The voices are again in polyphony for this movement.

Recordings 
A 1994 recording on the Vox label, featuring the Orchestra of Radio Luxembourg conducted by Darius Milhaud himself

References

External links 
 http://www.gramophone.co.uk/review/milhaud-chamber-symphonies
 https://www.youtube.com/watch?v=Uxg2Ldslg_Y

Symphonies by Darius Milhaud